Ivan Fesenko (born 22 August 1981) is a Russian skier. He competed in the Nordic combined event at the 2006 Winter Olympics.

References

External links
 

1981 births
Living people
Russian male Nordic combined skiers
Olympic Nordic combined skiers of Russia
Nordic combined skiers at the 2006 Winter Olympics
People from Berezniki
Sportspeople from Perm Krai